Alistair Bond (born 16 August 1989) is a New Zealand rower.

Bond is the younger brother of Hamish Bond. He has completed a Bachelor of Surveying degree from Otago University and gained his Masters of Environmental Management at Massey University.

At the 2014 World Rowing Championships held at Bosbaan, Amsterdam, he won a silver medal in the lightweight men's four with James Hunter, Peter Taylor, and Curtis Rapley.

References

1989 births
Living people
New Zealand male rowers
World Rowing Championships medalists for New Zealand
Rowers at the 2016 Summer Olympics
Olympic rowers of New Zealand
University of Otago alumni